Pulaski County Courthouse is a historic courthouse located at Pulaski, Pulaski County, Virginia. It was built in 1895–1896, and is a 2 1/2-story, Romanesque / Queen Anne style roughcut limestone building. The front facade features a projecting central entrance tower.  The building has a hipped roof, projecting corner towers, and a classically ornamented belfry covered by an elongated domical roof and capped by a lantern. It was designed by W. Chamberlain & Co.

It was added to the National Register of Historic Places in 1982.

The current building was reconstructed after being heavily damaged in a fire in December 1989.

References

County courthouses in Virginia
Courthouses on the National Register of Historic Places in Virginia
Queen Anne architecture in Virginia
Romanesque Revival architecture in Virginia
Government buildings completed in 1896
Buildings and structures in Pulaski County, Virginia
National Register of Historic Places in Pulaski County, Virginia
1896 establishments in Virginia